Oltre il Colle is a comune (municipality) in the Province of Bergamo in the Italian region of Lombardy, located about  northeast of Milan and about  northeast of Bergamo.

The municipality of Oltre il Colle contains the frazioni (subdivisions, mainly villages and hamlets) Zambla Alta, Zambla Bassa, and Zorzone.

Oltre il Colle borders the following municipalities: Ardesio, Cornalba, Oneta, Premolo, Roncobello, Serina.

Demographic evolution

References